Stefan Jonsson (born 2 June 1956) is a Swedish weightlifter and bodybuilder. He competed in the men's light heavyweight event at the 1980 Summer Olympics.

References

External links
 

1956 births
Living people
Swedish male weightlifters
Olympic weightlifters of Sweden
Weightlifters at the 1980 Summer Olympics
Sportspeople from Malmö
Swedish bodybuilders
20th-century Swedish people